The Christ the King Cathedral is a religious building belonging to the Catholic Church and is located in Gitega in the province of Gitega in the central part of Burundi.

Follow the Latin or Roman rite and functions as the headquarters of the Metropolitan Archdiocese of Gitega (Latin: Archidioecesis Kitegaensis) that was created on November 10, 1959 by the Bull "Cum parvulum" by the Pope John XXIII as part of the ecclesiastical province of Gitega.

Pope John Paul II visited the September 5, 1990 as part of his tour of several African countries. It is under the pastoral responsibility of Archbishop Simon Ntamwana.

See also
Roman Catholicism in Burundi
Christ the King Cathedral (disambiguation)

References

Roman Catholic cathedrals in Burundi
Buildings and structures in Gitega